The 2011 Eastern Illinois Panthers football team represented Eastern Illinois University as a member of the Ohio Valley Conference (OVC) during  the 2011 NCAA Division I FCS football season. Led by Bob Spoo in his 24th and final year as head coach, the Panthers compiled an overall record of 2–9 with a mark of 1–7 in conference play, placing last out of nine teams in the OVC. Eastern Illinois played home games at O'Brien Field in Charleston, Illinois.

Schedule

References

Eastern Illinois
Eastern Illinois Panthers football seasons
Eastern Illinois Panthers football